Lionel Robert Smith is a former New Zealand hurdler, who represented his country at the 1950 British Empire Games.

Biography
Smith was educated at Hutt Valley High School in the 1940s, where he was played in the school's 1st XV rugby union team at centre, alongside Ron Jarden.

Smith won the New Zealand national 120 yards hurdles title in 1949. At the 1950 British Empire Games in Auckland, he finished third in the second heat of the 120 yards hurdles. In the final, he placed sixth.

Smith's daughter is the New Zealand athlete and coach Kirsten Hellier.

References

1920s births
Living people
Athletes from Lower Hutt
People educated at Hutt Valley High School
Commonwealth Games competitors for New Zealand
Athletes (track and field) at the 1950 British Empire Games
New Zealand male hurdlers